Baker v. Morton, 79 U.S. (12 Wall.) 150 (1870), was the second of two land claim suits to come out of Omaha, Nebraska Territory, filed in September 1860, prior to statehood. A claim jumper filed suit against local land barons to stake out a homestead in the area that was to become the city of Omaha. The case was important for establishing homesteaders' rights and ensuring that the future growth of Omaha would benefit everyone, not just wealthy landowners and speculators.

Details
The case of Alexander H. Baker v. William S. Morton was a case of an ill-gotten land claim.

An adjoining  plot of land was owned by a man named Brown. The Omaha Claim Club did not recognize the men as legal residents for either of the plots and threatened the two men with death if they did not turn over the titles to the land. Baker and Brown conveyed their land titles in the face of potential harm. In 1860 Baker and Brown filed suits against the Club to get their titles back. The territorial court ruled against Baker, who appealed to the U.S. Supreme Court. The court ruled that the property was obtained under duress and was to be reinstated to the rightful owner.

Legacy
Today this case is cited by legal experts as precedent in cases of contractual holdup to establish the illegal nature of the Omaha Claim Club's activities and subsequent activities that exhibit this form of collusion.

See also
 Scriptown

References

External links

 

1870 in United States case law
United States Supreme Court cases
United States land use case law
Pioneer history of Omaha, Nebraska
United States Supreme Court cases of the Chase Court